Ría Celestun Biosphere Reserve is a biosphere reserve in Mexico. It is located on the northwestern Yucatán Peninsula in the states of Yucatán and Campeche. The reserve is home to extensive mangrove wetlands, and rich in birds and other wildlife.

Geography
It is bounded on the west by the Gulf of Mexico. It adjoins Los Petenes Biosphere Reserve to the south, and El Palmar State Reserve to the north.

The reserve includes coastal beaches and dunes, which enclose lagoons and wetlands. There are low uplands in the eastern portion of the reserve.

The reserve is home to about 7000 people. Celestún, located on the coast within the reserve, is the largest settlement. It a center for visitor-serving activities and eco-tourism. Other economic activities in the reserve include fishing and harvesting sea salt.

Ecology
The reserve protects extensive mangrove wetlands, part of a mangrove corridor known as the Petenes mangroves which extends along the western shore of the Yucatán Peninsula. Freshwater from the peninsula's extensive aquifer has an outlet in the reserve, mixing with the salt waters of the Gulf of Mexico in the wetlands.

There are coastal dunes, and tropical dry forests in the uplands.

The reserve is home to large and diverse populations of migratory and resident birds, with over 304 species identified. 56% of species are year-round residents, 43% are seasonal, and 1% are occasional visitors. American flamingoes (Phoenicopterus ruber) are a prominent species, with a population that can reach over 23,000 birds. Other bird species present here include the plumbeous kite (Ictinia plumbea) brant goose (Branta bernicla), Muscovy duck (Cairina moschata), piping plover (Charadrius melodus), ocellated turkey (Agriocharis ocellata), Yucatan poorwill (Nyctiphrynus yucatanicus), Yucatan wren (Campylorhynchus yucatanicus), Yucatan jay (Cyanocorax yucatanicus), and orange oriole (Icterus auratus). The reserve, together with the adjacent El Palmar State Reserve, is designated an Important bird area.

Conservation
The area was designated a biosphere reserve in 2000 by the Mexican government. In 2004 UNESCO designated it a biosphere reserve in the international Man and the Biosphere Programme, and in the same year it was designated a wetland of international importance under the Ramsar Convention.

In 2008 the Mexican government nominated the Ría Celestún and adjacent Los Petenes reserves as a World Heritage Site.

References

Biosphere reserves of Mexico
Ramsar sites in Mexico
Protected areas of Campeche
Protected areas of Yucatán
Wetlands of Mexico
Important Bird Areas of Mexico
World Heritage Tentative List for Mexico